Neocoelidia is a genus of leafhoppers in the family Cicadellidae. There are about 18 described species in Neocoelidia.

Species
These 18 species belong to the genus Neocoelidia:

 Neocoelidia balli Knull 1942 c g
 Neocoelidia bifida DeLong 1953 c g
 Neocoelidia candida Ball 1909 c g
 Neocoelidia diabola Knull 1942 c g
 Neocoelidia fuscodorsata Fowler 1900 c g
 Neocoelidia fuscovittata b
 Neocoelidia lactipennis Van Duzee 1890 c g
 Neocoelidia onca Kramer 1967 c g
 Neocoelidia orientalis DeLong 1953 c g
 Neocoelidia orovila Ball 1916 c g
 Neocoelidia pulchella Ball 1909 c g
 Neocoelidia reticulata Ball 1909 c g
 Neocoelidia romantica Knull 1942 c g
 Neocoelidia tuberculata Baker, 1898 c g b
 Neocoelidia tumidifrons Gillette & Baker, 1895 c g b
 Neocoelidia verecunda Fowler 1900 c g
 Neocoelidia virgata DeLong 1953 c g
 Neocoelidia vittapennis DeLong 1924 c g

Data sources: i = ITIS, c = Catalogue of Life, g = GBIF, b = Bugguide.net

References

Further reading

External links

 

Neocoelidiinae
Cicadellidae genera